The Vanuatu women's national basketball team is the basketball side that represents Vanuatu in international competitions. It is administered by the Vanuatu Amateur Basketball Federation.

The team appeared at the 1981 Oceania Basketball Tournament for Women and the 2011 Pacific Games.

References

External links
Vanuatu Basketball, News, Teams, Scores, ...

Basketball in Vanuatu
Basketball teams in Vanuatu
basketball
Women's national basketball teams